The River Ribble is a minor river running through the town of Holmfirth in Kirklees, West Yorkshire, England.

Rising at the outflow of Holme Styes Reservoir, itself fed by Reynard Clough (which has a tributary, Catholes Gutter), Hades Clough and Long Ing Dike, the Ribble flows northwards, collecting Fox Clough and Beaver Clough from the west, before joining the River Holme by Towngate and Hollowgate in Holmfirth. The confluence of the two rivers was also marked by a weir, but this was removed in 1944 when Italian prisoners of war were tasked with removing it.

References

Rivers of Kirklees
Holme Valley
Aire catchment